Heliomeris is a genus of flowering plants in the family Asteraceae known generally as false goldeneyes.

They are native to the western United States and northern Mexico.  One species, H. obscura, is separated from the others, endemic to a remote area on the border between the Mexican states of Puebla and Oaxaca

These are annual and perennial herbs producing sunflower-like radiate flower heads. They are distinguished from related genera by the achenes, which are glabrous and lack a pappus, and by the involucre, which consists of only 2 series of bracts.
 Species
 Heliomeris hispida - rough false goldeneye, hairy goldeneye - Sonora, Arizona, New Mexico, California, Utah
 Heliomeris longifolia - longleaf false goldeneye - Sonora, Chihuahua, Durango, Jalisco, San Luis Potosí, Michoacán, Chiapas, Arizona, New Mexico, Texas, Colorado, Utah, Nevada
 Heliomeris multiflora - showy goldeneye - from San Luis Potosí + southern California to Montana
 Heliomeris obscura - Puebla, Oaxaca 
 Heliomeris soliceps - tropical false goldeneye, paria sunflower - Kane County in Utah

References

External links
 Jepson Manual Treatment
 United States Department of Agriculture Plants Profile

Asteraceae genera
Heliantheae
Flora of North America